The 2013 NBA Finals was the championship series of the National Basketball Association's (NBA) 2012–13 season and conclusion of the season's playoffs, played from June 6 to June 20, 2013. The defending NBA champion and Eastern Conference champion Miami Heat, who were favored to win the series, defeated the Western Conference champion San Antonio Spurs in seven games to win their third championship.

The Miami Heat's league-best regular season record of 66–16 gave them home-court advantage against the San Antonio Spurs, who finished the regular season 58–24. The San Antonio Spurs won the opening game on the road and eventually took a 3–2 series lead before the Miami Heat won the remaining two games at home to win their second consecutive NBA title. LeBron James, who was named the season MVP, was also named Finals MVP for the second straight year.

Four former NBA Finals MVPs played in the series (the Spurs' Tim Duncan and Tony Parker, and the Heat's Dwyane Wade and LeBron James), the most since 1987. The 2013 Finals also set a record for most international players on either Finals roster (10). This also marks the last NBA Finals series to use the 2–3–2 format, which was introduced in 1985. The Spurs and the Heat would rematch the following year, with the Spurs winning 4–1; this was also the first Finals to use the 2–2–1–1–1 format since 1984.

Background
LeBron James and Tim Duncan previously faced off in the 2007 NBA Finals, when James was with the Cleveland Cavaliers, which saw the Spurs sweep the Cavaliers in four games, giving San Antonio their fourth NBA title. After the deciding game, Duncan sought out James in the locker room to praise him for a great series and told James that the league would be his someday.

In 2010, Spurs president of basketball and head coach Gregg Popovich made a congratulatory phone call to Heat president Pat Riley for signing LeBron James and Chris Bosh to play with Dwyane Wade.

San Antonio Spurs

This was the San Antonio Spurs' fifth appearance in the NBA Finals, attempting to win their fifth NBA championship in team history. The Spurs finished the regular season with 58 wins, finishing in first place in the Southwest Division and the second overall regular season record among Western Conference teams. They recorded only two losses in the first three rounds of the playoffs: they swept the Los Angeles Lakers in the first round in four games, eliminated the Golden State Warriors in six games in the second round, then swept the Memphis Grizzlies in the Western Conference Finals in four games.

Miami Heat

This was the Miami Heat's fourth appearance in the NBA Finals and the third appearance for three straight years, attempting to win their third NBA championship. The Heat finished with the best regular season record, recording a league leading 66 wins, and first place in the Southeast Division. They swept the Milwaukee Bucks in the first round of the playoffs in four games before eliminating the Chicago Bulls in five games in the second round, winning four straight games in the series. In the Eastern Conference Finals, the Heat defeated the Indiana Pacers in seven games.

Road to the Finals

Regular season series
The Heat won both games they played against the Spurs during the regular season: 105–100 on November 29, 2012, and 88–86 on March 31, 2013. For the November 29 game at Miami which was nationally televised, Popovich sat out starters Duncan, Tony Parker, Manu Ginóbili, and Danny Green, at the end of a long road trip in order to ensure they had enough rest for the playoffs, as the Spurs had some of the oldest players in the league. NBA commissioner David Stern was outraged when he learned of this and fined the Spurs $250,000 for not informing the Heat, the league or the media in a suitable time-frame that the four players were not making the trip to Miami. Despite the absence of their four starters, the Spurs led the game until the final minute when the Heat came back to win 105–100. The Heat responded somewhat in kind for their trip to San Antonio, as LeBron James, Dwyane Wade, and Mario Chalmers sat out with minor injuries, though those moves were understandable in light of Miami's dominant position for clinching the home-court advantage for the playoffs as well as the end two games earlier of the Heat's record 27-game winning streak. Miami ended up winning anyway thanks to a last-second 3-pointer from the top player they left active for the game, Chris Bosh.

Series summary

Game summaries
All times are in Eastern Daylight Time (UTC-4)

Game 1

San Antonio won the opener as Tony Parker scored on a bank shot with 5.2 seconds in regulation with the shot clock about to expire. San Antonio scored 23 points in the fourth quarter, while limiting Miami to just 16. Parker led the Spurs with 21 points and 6 assists. The Heat held a 52–49 halftime lead, and LeBron James recorded a triple-double in the game with 18 points, 18 rebounds, and 10 assists. However, Miami's Dwyane Wade, who scored 17 points, was shut out in the final period. Chris Bosh, who recorded 13 points, only scored 2 in the fourth quarter.

Game 2

Miami evened the series, using a 33–5 run in the final two quarters after the two teams were neck-and-neck late in the third. During that run, James made a highlight-reel block on a dunk attempt by Tiago Splitter early in the fourth quarter. The Heat also made 10 out of 19 three-point shots, and five players had double-digit scoring games: James (17), Mario Chalmers (19), Ray Allen (13), Bosh (12) and Wade (10).

Game 3

San Antonio bounced back in Game 3, setting the Finals record for most three-pointers in a game (16), and giving the Heat their worst loss in franchise playoff history. The Spurs ensured the game was a blowout by outscoring Miami 35–14 in the fourth quarter after leading 78–63 at the end of the third. Gary Neal had one of the best games of his career, making 6-of-10 three-point shot attempts and finishing with 24 points, and Danny Green led all Spurs players with 27 points while hitting 7-of-9 from behind the arc. The Spurs shined despite a lackluster game from Parker who scored only 6 points before he had to leave the game due to a hamstring injury. For the Heat, Mike Miller made all five of his three-point shots and finished with 15 points on the night, while Wade led the Heat with 16 points. However, James was held to just 7 of 21 shooting from the field, finished with only 15 points, and did not shoot a free throw for the first time in his Miami playoff career. After a strong showing in Game 2, Chalmers was held scoreless with one assist.

Game 4

The Heat evened the series again, pulling away from San Antonio in the second half after an even contest at halftime, 49–49. The Heat continued their streak of not losing consecutive games that the team started in January. The Big Three (the trio of James, Wade and Bosh) for Miami finally came together in a big way. James led the Heat with 33 points, while Wade had 32 and Bosh added 20. Tim Duncan led the Spurs with 20 points. Parker started strong with 15 points in the first half, but could not provide the Spurs with any offensive production in the second half.

Game 5

San Antonio used a marquee shooting performance to down the Heat and take a 3–2 series lead. The Heat trailed the Spurs by double digits for most of the game. Although they finally closed to within one point, 75–74, with 3:05 left in the third quarter, they could not overtake and San Antonio started to pull away after that. Making 42 of 70 shots, San Antonio became the first team to shoot at least 60 percent in an NBA Finals game since the Orlando Magic in Game 3 of the 2009 Finals. Parker led the Spurs with 26 points, while Green scored 24 points, with 6 three-pointers, breaking the all-time record for three-pointers in a Finals series, set by Allen in 2008. Manu Ginóbili, making his first start of the season, had a strong performance with 24 points and 10 assists. Duncan also contributed a double-double (17 points, 12 rebounds), and provided strong defensive support. At one point in the game, Spurs went on a 19–1 run, with Green and Ginóbili scoring most of those points. James and Wade turned in strong performances, leading the Heat with 25 points each, while Allen had five three-pointers (including two four-point plays) and scored 21 points total.

Game 6

The Heat rode a triple-double performance from James (32 points along with 11 assists and 10 rebounds)—becoming the first player since Magic Johnson in 1991 to have two triple doubles in the same NBA Finals series—and 20 points from Chalmers, while Duncan led the Spurs with 30 points and 17 rebounds; however, Duncan was held scoreless after the third quarter. Fans and media outlets alike have begun dubbing it "The Headband Game" in reference to the signature accessory James lost on a dunk with just under nine minutes left in the 4th quarter and did not wear the rest of the way. The game is considered by players and commentators to be one of the greatest games in NBA history. James regards it as one of the best games in which he has ever taken part. NBA legend Johnson called it "one of the best two or three games" he had ever seen. On July 17, 2013, Game 6 of the 2013 NBA Finals received the 2013 ESPY award for Best Game.

The Spurs were leading 75–65 at the end of the third quarter, but James sparked a 20–7 run for the Heat to start the fourth quarter, personally scoring 11 of those points. With 10:30 remaining, the Spurs still up 77–70, Miller's shoe came loose but he did not have time to put it back on so he tossed it off court; with one sock and one shoe he received a pass from James and sunk a three-pointer to pull the Heat within four.

With 2:09 remaining, the Heat pulled ahead 89–86 but the Spurs went on a run of their own spearheaded by Parker, who shot a stepback three and a reverse layup in consecutive possessions to put his team ahead 91–89. On the next possession, James lost the ball in the post; this eventually led to a pair of Ginóbili free throws after an intentional foul (by Allen) on the other end, pushing the score to 93–89. James committed a second crucial turnover forcing it into the hands of Ginóbili, who was fouled by Allen. Ginóbili missed one of two free throws, setting the stage for the comeback.

With 28.2 remaining, the Spurs were up 94–89, and league officials began bringing out the yellow tape to cordon off the floor for the Larry O'Brien Trophy presentation. James missed a three-pointer, but the ball was kept in Heat possession by Wade and Allen both tipping the ball until Miller got the rebound and passed to James, who made the three-pointer to pull within two points with 20 seconds left. After failing to steal the inbound pass, the Heat immediately fouled Kawhi Leonard, who also missed one of two free throws, keeping it a one-possession game at 95–92. James was entrusted with the final shot but missed a 26-foot jumper from beyond the arc. Bosh was able to collect a key offensive rebound before passing to Allen, who stepped backward and made a three-point basket from the right corner with 5.2 left to send the game into overtime. Spurs head coach Gregg Popovich had opted for a small lineup to defend the perimeter in the closing moments of the fourth quarter, resulting in the Spurs' Duncan being on the bench as both Heat's three-pointers came off of rebounds. The Spurs had no timeouts left after Allen's shot, but received a de facto extra timeout while officials reviewed video to confirm that Allen had both feet behind the 3-point line when he released the ball. Parker was able to drive the length of the court and launch a short off-balance jumper over James, but it became an airball as the buzzer sounded to end the 4th quarter.

In overtime, James hit a floater with 1:43 remaining to give Miami a 101–100 lead. That score would hold all the way down to final moments, where Wade missed a jumper trying to extend the lead, and San Antonio getting the rebound with 12 seconds left. The Spurs opted not to call timeout and let Ginóbili get a full head of steam heading towards the basket. However, Allen stripped the ball away from Ginobili on his way up for a shot and recovered the ball, forcing the Spurs to foul him with 1.9 left. Allen made both free throws to put Miami up 103–100. San Antonio still had a chance, but Bosh, who had a key block earlier in OT, came through with another key block in the final seconds to prevent a three-point game-tying shot from Green.

Game 7

James scored 37 points, including five 3-pointers, and grabbed 12 rebounds to lead Miami to a 95–88 victory in Game 7. With the win, the Heat captured their second consecutive NBA championship.
After a 3-point shot by Leonard, the Spurs trailed by just two with 50 seconds remaining in the game. They had a chance to tie the game, but Duncan, guarded by Shane Battier, missed a shot under the basket and a follow-up tip-in attempt. James went on to hit a 17-foot jumper that secured the victory.

Wade scored 23 points and had 10 rebounds, and Battier scored 18 points on six 3-pointers to offset scoreless nights by Bosh and Allen. James tied Tommy Heinsohn's record set in 1957 for most points in an NBA Finals Game 7 win, and won his second straight NBA Finals MVP.

This was the last game of Hall of Famer Tracy McGrady's career, as he retired after the 2012–13 season.

This Game 7 is the last under the 2–3–2 format before it was changed back to 2–2–1–1–1 the following year.

Rosters

Miami Heat

San Antonio Spurs

Player statistics

Miami Heat

|-
| align="left" |  || 7 || 0 || 27.5 || .543 || .545 || .923 || 2.3 || 1.6 || 0.1 || 0.0 || 10.6
|-
| align="left" |  || 5 || 0 || 14.2 || .727 || .000 || .600 || 3.0 || 0.0 || 0.8 || 0.6 || 4.4
|-
| align="left" |  || 4 || 0 || 3.7 || .500 || .000 || .000 || 1.8 || 0.0 || 0.0 || 0.0 || 0.5
|-
| align="left" |  || 7 || 0 || 12.4 || .444 || .444 || 1.000 || 1.6 || 0.9 || 0.1 || 0.3 || 5.6
|-
| align="left" |  || 7 || 7 || 34.3 || .462 || .000 || .733 || 8.9 || 2.1 || 1.9 || 1.6 || 11.9
|-
| align="left" |  || 7 || 7 || 31.6 || .388 || .406 || .692 || 2.7 || 2.1 || 0.7 || 0.0 || 10.6
|-
| align="left" |  || 5 || 0 || 16.3 || .273 || .333 || .500 || 1.0 || 2.4 || 0.8 || 0.2 || 3.0
|-
| align="left" |  || 6 || 3 || 10.6 || .444 || .000 || 1.000 || 2.8 || 0.0 || 0.0 || 0.2 || 1.5
|-! style="background:#FDE910;"
| align="left" |  || 7 || 7 || 43.0 || .447 || .353 || .795 || 10.9 || 7.0 || 2.3 || 0.9 || 25.3
|-
| align="left" |  || 3 || 0 || 3.9 || .400 || .667 || .000 || 0.3 || 0.0 || 0.0 || 0.3 || 2.0
|-
| align="left" |  || 3 || 0 || 3.9 || .333 || .000 || .000 || 0.7 || 0.7 || 0.0 || 0.0 || 1.3
|-
| align="left" |  || 7 || 4 || 21.8 || .591 || .611 || .000 || 2.7 || 0.9 || 0.6 || 0.3 || 5.3
|-
| align="left" |  || 7 || 7 || 36.4 || .476 || .000 || .773 || 4.0 || 4.6 || 1.9 || 1.3 || 19.6

San Antonio Spurs

|-
| align="left" |  || 3 || 0 || 5.8 || .455 || .000 || .333 || 2.7 || 0.3 || 0.7 || 0.0 || 3.7
|-
| align="left" |  || 6 || 0 || 6.1 || .400 || .250 || 1.000 || 1.2 || 0.2 || 0.2 || 0.0 || 1.8
|-
| align="left" |  || 2 || 0 || 2.5 || .000 || .000 || .000 || 0.5 || 0.5 || 0.0 || 0.0 || 0.0
|-
| align="left" |  || 6 || 0 || 15.7 || .500 || .500 || .750 || 2.5 || 1.7 || 0.0 || 0.2 || 4.0
|-
| align="left" |  || 7 || 7 || 36.3 || .490 || .000 || .821 || 12.1 || 1.4 || 0.9 || 1.4 || 18.9
|-
| align="left" |  || 7 || 3 || 28.5 || .433 || .250 || .786 || 2.1 || 4.3 || 0.7 || 0.0 || 11.6
|-
| align="left" |  || 7 || 7 || 35.4 || .444 || .551 || .875 || 4.1 || 0.7 || 1.0 || 1.6 || 14.0
|-
| align="left" |  || 6 || 0 || 7.1 || .444 || .000 || .500 || 1.0 || 1.0 || 0.3 || 0.0 || 1.8
|-
| align="left" |  || 7 || 7 || 36.5 || .513 || .348 || .706 || 11.1 || 0.9 || 2.0 || 0.4 || 14.6
|-
| align="left" |  || 2 || 0 || 7.2 || .000 || .000 || .000 || 2.0 || 2.5 || 0.0 || 0.5 || 0.0
|-
| align="left" |  || 2 || 0 || 6.7 || .400 || .000 || .000 || 0.5 || 0.0 || 0.0 || 0.0 || 2.0
|-
| align="left" |  || 7 || 0 || 24.4 || .414 || .467 || 1.000 || 2.4 || 0.9 || 0.0 || 0.0 || 9.4
|-
| align="left" |  || 7 || 7 || 35.2 || .412 || .286 || .727 || 1.9 || 6.4 || 1.0 || 0.1 || 15.7
|-
| align="left" |  || 7 || 4 || 15.4 || .448 || .000 || .800 || 2.0 || 0.4 || 0.7 || 0.4 || 4.9

Broadcast
In the United States, the NBA Finals aired on ABC and Mike Breen and Jeff Van Gundy served as commentators. ESPN Radio aired it as well and had Mike Tirico and Hubie Brown as commentators. For the first time, ESPN Deportes provided exclusive Spanish-language coverage of The Finals, with a commentary team of Álvaro Martín, Carlos Morales, and Alejandro Montecchia.

See also

References

External links
2013 NBA Finals Official Site
2013 NBA Finals at ESPN

National Basketball Association Finals
Finals
NBA Finals
NBA Finals
2010s in Miami
21st century in San Antonio
Sports competitions in Miami
Basketball competitions in San Antonio
NBA
NBA
June 2013 sports events in the United States
ABS-CBN television specials